Edward Bolton Clive (c. 1765 – 22 July 1845) was a British Whig politician.

Background
Clive was the son of George Clive and Sidney, daughter of Thomas Bolton.

Political career
Clive was High Sheriff of Herefordshire in 1802 and then sat as Member of Parliament for Hereford between 1826 and 1845.

Family
Clive married the Hon. Harriet, daughter of Andrew Archer, 2nd Baron Archer, in 1790. They had several children, including George Clive and Reverend Archer Clive, grandfather of Sir Robert Clive. Clive died in July 1845.

References

External links

1760s births
1845 deaths
Year of birth uncertain
Members of the Parliament of the United Kingdom for English constituencies
UK MPs 1826–1830
UK MPs 1830–1831
UK MPs 1831–1832
UK MPs 1832–1835
UK MPs 1835–1837
UK MPs 1837–1841
UK MPs 1841–1847
Whig (British political party) MPs for English constituencies
High Sheriffs of Herefordshire